A general election was held in the U.S. state of Wyoming on Tuesday, November 5, 1974. All of the state's executive officers—the Governor, Secretary of State, Auditor, Treasurer, and Superintendent of Public Instruction—were up for election. Democratic gubernatorial nominee Edgar Herschler won a sizable victory in the gubernatorial election, and while Democrats generally improved their margins in the other statewide races, they fell short in all four.

Governor

Incumbent Republican Governor Stanley Hathaway opted to retire rather than run for a third consecutive term. Former State Senator Dick Jones won a close Republican primary to succeed him, and faced former State Representative Edgar Herschler, the Democratic nominee, in the general election. Despite the growing Republican dominance in Wyoming, Herschler took advantage of the national Democratic wave and defeated Jones by a sizable margin, becoming the first Democrat to win a gubernatorial election in the state since 1958.

Secretary of State
Incumbent Republican Secretary of State Thyra Thomson ran for re-election to a fourth term. In the Democratic primary, attorney Charles Carroll, a new arrival to the state, beat out Paul Crane, the son of former Governor Arthur G. Crane. However, despite the national Democratic wave and Edgar Herschler's large victory, Thomson's personal popularity allowed her to defeat Carroll in a landslide.

Democratic primary

Candidates
 Charles Carroll, attorney
 Paul Crane, son of former Governor Arthur G. Crane

Results

Republican primary

Candidates
 Thyra Thomson, incumbent Secretary of State

Results

General election

Results

Auditor
Everett T. Copenhaver resigned as State Auditor on June 30, 1973, and Governor Stanley Hathaway appointed Deputy State Treasurer Ed Witzenburger as his replacement. Though Witzenburger would have been eligible to seek re-election to a full term as Auditor, he came to an agreement with State Treasurer Jim Griffith, who was barred from seeking a second consecutive term, to instead run for Treasurer so Griffith could run for Auditor. Griffith won the Republican primary unopposed, and no Democrats initially filed to run against him. However, former State Representative Bob Adams, despite losing the primary for State Treasurer, received 59 write-in votes in the Democratic primary, was offered the nomination, and ended up accepting it. Griffith ultimately defeated Adams by a wide margin, winning his first of three terms as State Auditor.

Democratic primary
No Democratic candidates filed for State Auditor. However, former State Representative Bob Adams received 59 votes as a write-in in the Democratic primary, despite not campaigning, and was offered the nomination. Richard Ford Pew, an oil fortune scion who served as George McGovern's Wyoming state coordinator for his 1972 presidential campaign, received 55 votes and Adams said that he would step aside if Pew wanted the nomination. However, Pew declined the nomination and Adams ultimately accepted it.

Republican primary

Candidates
 Jim Griffith, Wyoming State Treasurer

Results

General election

Results

Treasurer
Incumbent Republican State Treasurer Jim Griffith was unable to seek re-election to a second term because of a constitutional bar on state treasurers succeeding themselves, so he came to an agreement with appointed State Auditor Ed Witzenburger in which Griffith ran for Auditor and Witzenburger ran for Treasurer. Witzenburger won the Republican primary unopposed and faced former State Representative Elizabeth Phelan, who had previously sought the Democratic nomination for Treasurer in 1970, in the general election. Witzenburger fell significantly short of Griffith's strong performance in the election four years prior, and ended up barely defeating Phelan, winning by a little more than 4,000 votes.

Democratic primary

Candidates
 Elizabeth Phelan, former State Representative, 1970 Democratic candidate for Treasurer
 Bob Adams, former State Representative, former State Representative from Laramie County, 1970 Democratic candidate for Treasurer, 1966 Democratic nominee for Treasurer, 1962 Democratic nominee for Treasurer, 1958 Democratic nominee for State Auditor, 1954 Democratic nominee for State Auditor

Results

Republican primary

Candidates
 Ed Witzenburger, Wyoming State Auditor

Results

General election

Results

Superintendent of Public Instruction
Incumbent Republican Superintendent of Public Instruction Robert G. Schrader ran for re-election to a second term. Two Democrats filed to oppose him: former teacher Sydney Spiegel and John Seyfang, the Superintendent of Schools in the city of Worland. Spiegel narrowly defeated Seyfang in the primary and advanced to the general election against Schrader. Even though most statewide races tightened as the outlook improved for Democratic candidates, Seyfang improved on his margin of victory from four years prior, defeating Spiegel in a landslide.

Democratic primary

Candidates
 Sydney Spiegel, former Cheyenne teacher
 John Seyfang, Worland Superintendent of Schools

Results

Republican primary

Candidates
 Robert G. Schrader, incumbent State Superintendent of Public Instruction

Results

General election

Results

References

 
Wyoming